Mohamed Mekhazni (born 12 February 1978) is an Algerian football manager.

References

1978 births
Living people
Algerian football managers
MC Alger managers
USM Alger managers
MC Saïda managers
RC Arbaâ managers
Algerian Ligue Professionnelle 1 managers
21st-century Algerian people